Gongsun is one of the few Chinese compound surnames.

Famous people with this surname include:
 Gongsun Xuanyuan, reputed name of the Yellow Emperor; other sources say his surname was Ji
 Gongsun Shu, emperor of Chengjia
  Gongsun Shan Yang, Legalist philosopher
 Gongsun 'Xishou' Yan, Warring States era Qin premier and Wei strategist
 Gongsun Long, philosopher, Logician
 Gongsun Ao General of the Han Dynasty
 Gongsun Zan, warlord and general of the Han Dynasty
 Rulers of Liaodong in the Three Kingdoms:
 Gongsun Du, general of the Han Dynasty 
 Gongsun Kang, elder son of Gongsun Du
 Gongsun Gong, younger son of Gongsun Du
 Gongsun Yuan, younger son of Gongsun Kang, claimed independence and set up Yan Kingdom
 Gongsun Qiao, statesman of the State of Zheng 
 Gongsun Sheng, character from Water Margin
 Gongsun Lü'e, character from The Return of the Condor Heroes
 Gongsun Ce, the adviser or personal secretary of Bao Zheng

Chinese-language surnames
Individual Chinese surnames